Commelin may refer to:

Commelin (elm hybrid), a Dutch elm cultivar

People with the surname
Caspar Commelin (1668-–1731), Dutch botanist
Jan Commelin (1629–1692), Dutch botanist
Isaac Commelin (1598–1676), Dutch historian

See also
 Commelina, commonly called dayflowers